A Time for Love (Na ge bu duo qing) is a 1970 Hong Kong Shaw Brothers comedy film directed by Kuei Chih-Hung.

Cast
 Cheng Kwan-Min
 Lily Ho
 Shirley Huang
 Lee Kwan
 Ai Lien Pan
 Dean Shek as  Chau Ping
 Wu Wei

External links
 
 Hong Kong Cinemagic entry

1970 films
1970 comedy films
Shaw Brothers Studio films
Hong Kong comedy films
1970s Hong Kong films
1970s Mandarin-language films